Alfred Jan Maksymilian Kowalski (Alfred Wierusz-Kowalski; 11 October 184916 February 1915) was a Polish painter and representative of the Munich School.

Life
He was born on 11 October 1849 in Suwałki to father Teofil Kowalski of the Wieruszowa Coat of Arms and mother Teofilia (née Siewierska).

Wierusz-Kowalski settled in Munich in 1876 after studies in Warsaw, Prague, and Dresden. He studied for a year at the Munich Academy of Fine Arts, and worked under Józef Brandt and Alexander von Wagner. In 1890 he was nominated as an honorary professor of the Munich Academy.

He was the most popular Polish painter in Munich, alongside Józef Brandt. His paintings received medals at numerous art exhibitions and were sought-after by collectors and German art dealers.

He painted landscapes, generic and historical scenes. After his journey to Africa in 1903 he also undertook oriental themes. His works were sold mostly on the German market and many of them ended in private collections in Germany and the United States. Some of his paintings can be seen in collections of Polish museums. Kowalski's Lone Wolf was the most famous and one of his most reproduced paintings, which gained great popularity especially in the United States.

He died on 16 February 1915 and was initially buried at the Munich Waldfriedhof Cemetery. His remains were later transferred to the Powązki Cemetery in Warsaw.

In 1972, a permanent exhibition of his works was opened in the District Museum in Suwałki.

Selected paintings

See also
List of Polish painters

References

External links
 
 Paintings

1849 births
1915 deaths
People from Suwałki
People from Augustów Governorate
Polish male painters
19th-century Polish painters
19th-century German male artists
20th-century Polish painters
20th-century Polish male artists
Academy of Fine Arts, Munich alumni
Munich School